Acquiring the Taste is the second album of British progressive rock band Gentle Giant, released in 1971. It was the final album by the band to feature original drummer Martin Smith.

Production
The recording was made at the following studios
Advision Studios – (Engineers: Martin Rushent, Big A & Garybaldi)
A.I.R. Studios, London – (Engineer: Bill Price)

This was a departure from the blues and soul styles found on their self-titled debut. It was more experimental, more discordant, and with more varied instrumentation. In the sleeve text, the band made this famous declaration:
It is our goal to expand the frontiers of contemporary popular music at the risk of being very unpopular. We have recorded each composition with the one thought – that it should be unique, adventurous and fascinating. It has taken every shred of our combined musical and technical knowledge to achieve this. From the outset we have abandoned all preconceived thoughts of blatant commercialism. Instead we hope to give you something far more substantial and fulfilling. All you need to do is sit back, and acquire the taste.

The song "Pantagruel's Nativity" is inspired by the books of Gargantua and Pantagruel by François Rabelais.

At 39 minutes and 26 seconds, it is the longest studio album the group ever released.

Artwork
The album cover has some innuendo in that it is made to look like a tongue licking an anus. However, when opened completely, it is actually a tongue licking a peach. In 2005, it was featured in Pitchforks list of "The Worst Record Covers of All Time".

Track listing

Personnel

Gentle Giant
Gary Green – 6-string electric guitar (tracks 1, 3, 6), electric guitars (tracks 5, 8), 12-string electric guitar (track 1), 12 string electric wah-wah guitar (track 7), mandolin (track 3), bass guitar (track 3), donkey's jawbone (track 7), cat calls (track 7), voice on track 8
Kerry Minnear – Minimoog (tracks 1–5), piano (tracks 3, 5, 6, 8), Hammond organ (tracks 1–3), Mellotron (tracks 1, 5, 6), harpsichord (tracks 2, 5, 6), electric piano (tracks 2, 6), celeste (track 3), clavichord (track 3), xylophone (tracks 2, 3), vibraphone (tracks 1, 7), tympani (track 2), cello (tracks 2, 3, 7), maracas (track 7), tambourine (track 7), lead vocals (tracks 1, 2), vocals (tracks 3, 5, 6, 8)
Derek Shulman – alto saxophone (tracks 1, 6), clavichord (track 3), cowbell (track 3), lead vocals (tracks 3, 5, 6), vocals (tracks 1, 2, 7, 8)
Phil Shulman – clarinet (track 2), trumpet (tracks 1, 3), alto (track 6) and tenor saxophone (tracks 1, 6), piano (track 3), claves (track 7), maracas (track 8), lead vocals (track 7), vocals (tracks 1–3, 5, 6, 8)
Ray Shulman – bass (tracks 1–3, 5–8), violin (tracks 2, 3, 5), violins (track 7), viola (track 7), electric violin (track 8), Spanish guitar (tracks 2, 3), 12 string guitars (track 6), tambourine (track 5), skulls (track 7), organ bass pedals (track 6), vocals (tracks 1–3, 6)
Martin Smith – drums (tracks 1–3, 5–8), tambourine (track 1), gong (track 2), side drum (track 2)

Guest musicians
Paul Cosh – trumpet (track 3), organ (track 3)
Tony Visconti – descant recorders (track 5), treble recorder (tracks 3, 5), tenor recorder (track 5), bass drum (track 7), triangle (track 7)
Chris Thomas – Moog programmer (tracks 1–5)

Release details
1971, UK, Vertigo 6360 041, release date July 16, 1971, LP
1971, UK, Vertigo 6360 041, release date ? ? 1971, Cassette
1971, US, Vertigo VEL 1005, release date August 1971, LP (with gatefold cover)
1971, US, Vertigo VEL 1005, release date ? ? 1971, Cassette
1997, UK, Vertigo 842 917-2, release date ? February 1997, CD
1997, US, Polydor 8429172, release date ? February 1997, CD
2005, UK, Repertoire REPUK1072, release date 28 November 2005, CD (limited edition reissue)

References

1971 albums
Albums produced by Tony Visconti
Gentle Giant albums
Repertoire Records albums
Vertigo Records albums
Polydor Records albums
Mercury Records albums